The Women's K-4 200m event at the 2010 South American Games was held over March 29 at 11:00.

Medalists

Results

References
Final

200m K-4 Women